Out Of Afrika is a charity founded in the United Kingdom that works at grassroots level with communities in Kenya. It aims to promote education for orphans and disadvantaged children to increase self-sufficiency and long term sustainability.

The charity has since established a college in Kenya, The International Centre of Technology (ICT), located in the outskirts of Thika in the Central Province of Kenya. It was established in January 2007, under the management of Out of Afrika. It offers academic courses in Information Technology, Professional Fire Fighting, Business, Community Development, Vocational Training, and Disaster Management.

References

External links
Official website
Press release

Charities based in Kenya
Charities based in Dorset